Guy Clark is the third studio album by the Texas singer-songwriter Guy Clark, released in 1978. It was his first on the Warner Bros. label.

Critical reception
Record Collector wrote: "More experimental than the straight country of its predecessors, on which cellos and harpsichords dovetailed with more traditional Nashville instrumentation, Clark’s sly wit is in abundance on 'Comfort And Crazy' and 'Shade Of All Greens.'"

The song, "Fools for Each Other" was covered by Johnny Rodriguez in 1979, reaching no. 14 on the country charts for that year. It was also later included in the albums, The Platinum Collection, The Essential Guy Clark, and Craftsman. Another version was recorded in 1986 as a duet by Lynn Anderson and Ed Bruce, which was included on Bruce's studio album, Night Things, peaking at No. 49 on the country charts as a single.

Track listing
All songs written by Guy Clark except as noted.
 "Fool on the Roof"
 "Fools for Each Other"
 "Shade of All Greens"
 "Voilà, An American Dream" (Rodney Crowell)
 "One Paper Kid" (Walter Cowart)
 "In the Jailhouse Now" (Jimmie Rodgers)
 "Comfort and Crazy"
 "Don't You Take It Too Bad" (Townes Van Zandt)
 "Houston Kid"
 "Fool on the Roof Blues"

Personnel
Guy Clark – vocals, guitar
Bee Spears – bass guitar
Mickey Raphael – harmonica
Lea Jane Berinati – keyboards, background vocals
David Briggs – keyboards, background vocals
Buck White – mandolin
Don Brooks – harmonica
Philip Donnelly – guitar
Jack Hicks – banjo
Jerry Kroon – drums
Albert Lee – guitar
John Goldthwaite – guitar
Don Everly – background vocals
Gordon Payne – background vocals
Sharon Hicks – background vocals
Rodney Crowell – background vocals
Frank Davis – background vocals
Cheryl White – background vocals
Byron Bach – cello

Singles
"Fools for Each Other" reached No. 96 in the Billboard country singles chart.

References

1978 albums
Guy Clark albums
Warner Records albums